Where the Light Is: John Mayer Live in Los Angeles, commonly referred to as Where the Light Is, is a live album and concert film by American musician John Mayer. Released on July 1, 2008, the album documents Mayer's performance at the Nokia Theatre at L.A. Live in Los Angeles, California on December 8, 2007, during the promotional tour for his 2006 third studio album Continuum.

The concert in question, which was for the Annual John Mayer Holiday Charity Revue, featured three separate performances: the first an acoustic set opened by Mayer and joined by the guitarists from his band, the second with the John Mayer Trio, and the third with Mayer's regular touring band. The title of the album is taken from a line in the song "Gravity", which was released as the second single from Continuum on January 31, 2007. Where the Light Is was released in a number of formats, including, for the audio album, Compact Disc, LP album and digital download; and, for the video album, DVD and Blu-ray Disc; as well as a 2CD+DVD set. The DVD and Blu-ray bonus material includes footage of Mayer backstage and playing outside on Mulholland Drive.

His acoustic cover of "Free Fallin'," originally by Tom Petty, was released as a single and met with wide critical acclaim.

The songs “No Such Thing” and “Bigger Than My Body” were played on the evening as well but did not make it to the final release. This is likely due to John singing an incorrect lyric in “No Such Thing”, singing “Well I never lived the kings of the prom kings” rather than the correct lyric, “Well I never lived the dreams of the prom kings”, as well as a noticeable tempo increase about 3 minutes into the song. As for "Bigger Than My Body", there’s some speculation that J.J. Johnson and David LaBruyere (drums and bass, respectively) lost the beat about 3 minutes into the song.

Track listing

Personnel

Musicians
All sets:
John Mayer – lead vocals, lead guitar, production
John Mayer Trio set:
Steve Jordan – drums, backing vocals, production
Pino Palladino – bass
John Mayer band set:
David Ryan Harris – rhythm guitar, tambourine, backing vocals
Robbie McIntosh – guitar, slide guitar, backing vocals
David LaBruyere – bass
J.J. Johnson – drums
Tim Bradshaw – keyboards, lap steel guitar, backing vocals
Bob Reynolds – tenor saxophone, soprano saxophone
Brad Mason – trumpet, flugelhorn

Audio production personnel
Chad Franscoviak – production, mixing
Ed Cherney – engineering
Ian Charbonneau – engineering
Anthony Catalano – Pro Tools engineering
Martin Pradler – mixing
Jeremy Underwood – mixing assistance
Stephen Marcussen – mastering
Video production personnel
Michael McDonald – executive production
Lindha Narvaez – production
Paul Greenhouse – editing
Additional personnel
Vance Burberry – photography

Reception and chart performance

Guitarist magazine gave the album five stars, saying the disc proves that "Mayer, 30, is the complete package as a singer, songwriter and guitarist."

In the United States, the album debuted on the Billboard 200 albums chart at number five. and has sold 258,359 copies.

The album also debuted in Australia on the ARIA Albums Chart at number 30. It also debuted at number-two on the Top 40 DVD chart. In its second week, the album was certified gold by ARIA for DVD shipments of 7,500 copies.

Weekly charts

Year-end charts

Certifications

References

John Mayer video albums
2008 live albums
2008 video albums
Live video albums